Ajou Deng (born 22 March 1978) is a Sudanese-British retired professional basketball player and current coach. He is the son of Aldo Deng, a former Sudanese politician and is the brother of Luol Deng, an NBA player who was also his teammate on Great Britain's national team.

College basketball 
The 6’11" center played his university basketball in Connecticut with the Fairfield Stags from 2001 through 2003 after two years playing for the University of Connecticut Huskies from 1999 to 2001. While playing basketball for the Uconn Huskies, his nickname was "Juice."   His career was known for not measuring up to the tremendous amount of hype that preceded his arrival at the Huskies. College basketball analysts like Billy Packer and Dick Vitale once predicted that he could be the best player ever there.

Professional basketball 

After graduating from Fairfield, Deng returned to Great Britain, where his family had been granted asylum, and joined the professional team Brighton Bears for the 2004-05 season. In 37 games Deng scored 428 points, an average of 11.57 per game, and averaged nearly 10 rebounds and 1.5 blocks. He started the following season with the Scottish Rocks before joining the Guildford Heat.

He played 37 games during the 2005-06 season, scored 398 points – an average of 10.76 per game – and had 6.43 rebounds and one block per game. Deng was named BBL player of the month in March 2006 and was a BBL All-Star that year as well. He won a BBL Cup winner’s medal with Brighton his first year as a professional.

Deng sat out the 2006-07 season with an ankle injury. He underwent treatment in Chicago, United States, where he stayed with his brother, Luol Deng, a forward for the Chicago Bulls of the NBA. Deng returned to the Heat on 7 December 2007 to replace Carlton Aaron, who had recently been cut by the team.

Deng left the Guildford Heat in February 2008 before the BBL Trophy Final to join Slavia Tu Kosice in Slovakia.

Coaching career
In 2020, Deng was the head coach of the South Sudan national basketball team.

References

External links 
Guildford Heat Profile
College stats for Huskies and Stags

1978 births
Living people
Black British sportsmen
Brighton Bears players
British Basketball League players
British expatriate basketball people in Slovakia
British expatriate basketball people in the United States
Centers (basketball)
Dinka people
English men's basketball players
Fairfield Stags men's basketball players
Glasgow Rocks players
Surrey Scorchers players
Milford Academy alumni
Naturalised citizens of the United Kingdom
Parade High School All-Americans (boys' basketball)
People from Western Bahr el Ghazal
South Sudanese men's basketball players
South Sudanese emigrants to the United Kingdom
Refugees in Egypt
South Sudanese expatriate basketball people in the United States
Sportspeople from Guildford
South Sudanese refugees
UConn Huskies men's basketball players